The Dorchester Area Schools Partnership (DASP) is a group of 19 schools in the Dorchester area. It includes 13 first schools, three middle schools, an upper school (The Thomas Hardye School), an independent school and a learning centre.

History 
It was formed in 1992 with a mission to provide the best education for those educated in the Dorchester, Dorset area.

Ofsted 
It was praised by Ofsted for providing "a means for passing information about pupils and for building curriculum continuity which enables schools to share resources effectively".

DASP Student Voice 
The DASP Student Voice is a representative body of the students across all DASP schools. Meetings are hosted by different schools every term and a wide range of issues are raised from the environment to sports and music.  Most recently, they have been discussing the Student Voice Olympic Dreams Project led by The Thomas Hardye School and their partnership with The Doon School in India. Another big project has been the DASP Olympic Torch Relay.

References 

Education in Dorchester, Dorset
1992 establishments in England